Walter Smith (1885 – after 1915) was an English professional footballer who scored 30 goals in 100 appearances in the Football League playing for Bury and Birmingham. He played as an inside forward.

Smith was born in Bootle, Lancashire. After an unsuccessful trial with Liverpool in 1907, he played for Southend United and Chester before joining Bury in December 1911. Though his first season ended in relegation from the First Division, Smith stayed another two years, and over his career at Bury he scored at a rate better than one goal every three games. He joined fellow Second Division club Birmingham towards the end of the 1913–14 season. The club were looking for a creative player to supply chances for Andy Smith and Jack Hall, but Smith lost out in this role to England international Jimmy Windridge, whose second spell with Birmingham coincided with Smith's arrival. He went on to play for Altrincham during the First World War.

References

1885 births
Year of death missing
Footballers from Birmingham, West Midlands
English footballers
Association football forwards
Southend United F.C. players
Chester City F.C. players
Bury F.C. players
Birmingham City F.C. players
Altrincham F.C. players
Date of birth missing
Place of death missing
Sportspeople from Bootle